Michael Charles McKenry (born March 4, 1985), nicknamed "The Fort", is an American former professional baseball catcher. He played in Major League Baseball (MLB) for the Pittsburgh Pirates, Colorado Rockies, and St. Louis Cardinals.

High school and college
McKenry attended Cedar Bluff Middle School, Farragut High School, and Middle Tennessee State University.  In 2004, he played summer college baseball with the Bethesda Big Train of the Cal Ripken Collegiate Baseball League.

International career
McKenry was originally named to the USA roster for the 2009 Baseball World Cup, but was injured and replaced by Lucas May before the tournament began.

Professional career

Colorado Rockies
McKenry was drafted by the Colorado Rockies in the 7th round of the 2006 Major League Baseball Draft. In 2006, he played for the Tri-City Dust Devils. In 2007, he played for the Asheville Tourists. In 2008, he played for the Modesto Nuts. In January 2009, Baseball America rated McKenry the #9 prospect in the Colorado Rockies organization. In 2009, he played for the Tulsa Drillers. In 2010, he played for the Colorado Springs Sky Sox, before being called up to the Rockies in September. McKenry made his major league debut on September 8, 2010, flying out against Cincinnati Reds pitcher Carlos Fisher in his only at bat. On March 29, 2011, McKenry was traded to the Boston Red Sox for minor league RHP Daniel Turpen.

Boston Red Sox
On March 29, 2011, McKenry was traded to the Boston Red Sox for minor league RHP Daniel Turpen. On June 13, 2011, he was traded to the Pittsburgh Pirates for cash or a player to be named later.

Pittsburgh Pirates
On June 13, 2011, he was traded to the Pittsburgh Pirates for cash or a player to be named later. McKenry made his debut for the Pirates on June 13 and recorded his first major league hit, a single off Houston Astros starter J. A. Happ, two days later. He hit his first major league home run on July 8, 2011 against the Chicago Cubs' Carlos Marmol.

On July 26, McKenry was involved in a controversial play against the Atlanta Braves in the bottom of the 19th inning. With runners on the corners, Scott Proctor hit a ground ball to Pedro Alvarez, who threw to McKenry, who appeared to tag Julio Lugo out at home. However, home plate umpire Jerry Meals called him safe, allowing Lugo to score the walk-off run.

McKenry has been given the nickname "Fort McKenry" or simply "The Fort" by fans and media in Pittsburgh due to his defensive skills behind the plate as the Pirates' catcher and the similarity of his name to Fort McHenry, the famous fort in Baltimore known for its role in the War of 1812.

On April 14, 2013 McKenry posted his first multi-homer game in the major leagues as he hit 2 home runs, rallying the Pirates to a 10-7 win over the Cincinnati Reds. On July 30, 2013, McKenry underwent knee surgery to repair a torn meniscus and was ruled out for the rest of the 2013 season.

On December 2, 2013, the Pirates acquired Chris Stewart from the New York Yankees, and designated McKenry for assignment. He was non-tendered by the Pirates later that day, becoming a free agent.

Second stint with Rockies
McKenry signed a minor league deal with the Colorado Rockies on January 16, 2014.

Texas Rangers
McKenry signed a minor league deal with the Texas Rangers in December 2015. He was released on May 25, 2016.

St. Louis Cardinals
On May 27, 2016, McKenry signed a minor league contract with the St. Louis Cardinals.  The Cardinals called him up on July 7; he made two plate appearances, and was designated for assignment on July 19.

Atlanta Braves
On July 22, McKenry signed a minor league contract with the Atlanta Braves.

Milwaukee Brewers
On August 15, 2016, he was traded to the Milwaukee Brewers for an unknown return.

Tampa Bay Rays
On December 16, 2016, McKenry signed a minor league contract with the Tampa Bay Rays. He elected free agency on November 6, 2017.

Retirement
On February 2, 2018, McKenry announced his retirement to join MTSU as the director of player development.  On February 9, 2018, the Pittsburgh Pirates announced he would serve as a studio analyst on the team's pregame and postgame shows.

Personal life
McKenry is the son of Cliff and Shelia McKenry. He married his wife, Jaclyn, in 2008.

References

External links

Middle Tennessee State Bio

1985 births
Living people
Baseball players from Knoxville, Tennessee
Major League Baseball catchers
Colorado Rockies players
Pittsburgh Pirates players
St. Louis Cardinals players
Middle Tennessee Blue Raiders baseball players
Tri-City Dust Devils players
Asheville Tourists players
Waikiki Beach Boys players
Modesto Nuts players
Phoenix Desert Dogs players
Tulsa Drillers players
Leones del Escogido players
American expatriate baseball players in the Dominican Republic
Colorado Springs Sky Sox players
Pawtucket Red Sox players
Round Rock Express players
Memphis Redbirds players
Gwinnett Braves players
Durham Bulls players
Farragut High School alumni
Major League Baseball broadcasters
Pittsburgh Pirates announcers